Australia is home to four professional football codes. This is a comprehensive list of crowd figures for Australian football codes in 2011. It includes several different competitions and matches from soccer, Australian rules football, rugby league and rugby union (international rules football is a code of football played by Australian rules footballers). Sydney, Melbourne and Brisbane have teams represented in all four codes. Hobart and Darwin are Australia's only capital cities without a professional football team. Crowds exceeding 80,000 gathered 11 times for football games in Australia during 2011: 9 of them for Australian rules matches and 2 for rugby league matches.

Included competitions

National competitions
Several football codes have national (domestic) competitions in Australia, the following are taken into consideration:

The 2011–12 A-League season (A-L)
 2011–12 A-League regular season
 2011–12 A-League final series
The 2011 Australian Football League season (AFL)
 2011 NAB Cup
 2011 AFL regular season
 2011 AFL finals series
The 2011 National Rugby League season (NRL)
 2011 NRL regular season
 2011 NRL finals series
The 2011 Super Rugby season (SR)
 2011 Super Rugby season
 2011 Super Rugby finals series

Two of these leagues, specifically the NRL and A-League, have one club each in New Zealand, while only five of the fifteen Super Rugby franchises are located in Australia, with the other ten are split evenly between New Zealand and South Africa. Attendance figures for non-Australian clubs are not taken into account in the figures on this page.

Other competitions
Other competitions, such as international and representative competitions, included are:

The 2011 AFC Champions League (ACL)
The 2011 State of Origin series (SoO)
The 2011 Tri Nations Series (Tri Nat)

Note: For these competitions, only figures for games that take place in Australia are taken into account

Non-competition games
Some non-competition matches (such as friendly and exhibition matches) are also included:

Home test matches played by the Australian National Rugby League Team, the Kangaroos, in 2011.
Home test matches played by the Australian National Association Football Team, the Socceroos, in 2011.
Home test matches played by the Australian National Rugby Union Team, the Wallabies, in 2011.
NRL All Stars match, in 2011.
City vs Country Origin match, in 2011.
 Flood Appeal: Legends of Origin match, celebrity and former player charity exhibition match
E. J. Whitten Legends Game, celebrity and former player Australian Rules charity exhibition match

Note: this list will be updated as more games are scheduled.

Competitions not included
There are several notable semi-professional regional and state based competitions which draw notable attendances and charge an entry fee that are not listed here.  These are worth mentioning as some of their attendances rival those of national competitions and compete for spectator interest.

These include (ranked by approximate season attendances):

*includes finals

As the attendance figures for some of these competitions can be difficult to obtain (many don't publish season figures and some play matches as curtain raisers to other events), they have not been included in the official lists.

Attendances by Code
In order to directly compare sports, the total attendances for each major code are listed here. The colour-coding of the different codes is used throughout the article.

Note that only the competitions that appear on this page excluding those specifically not included are considered, there are many other (generally smaller) competitions, leagues and matches that take place for all of the football codes, but these are not included. The following are included:

 The rugby league figures include representative matches (State of Origin and International Tests Matches).
 Association football (soccer) attendances include A-League regular season and finals matches, and local attendances for international representative matches.

Attendances by League
Some codes have multiple competitions, several competitions are compared here.

Only matches and competitions specifically controlled and sanctioned by each league are counted; matches such as inter-club trial matches are not counted.
Due to the irregular nature of the Round 1 matches of the 2011 NAB Cup, each set of three Round 1 matches are counted as one match.

Attendances by Team
Total home attendances for domestic league competitions are listed here.

Teams are listed by competition – tournament and league competitions that are more than one game in length are taken into consideration.

Attendances by Match
Attendances for single matches are listed here. Note that not all matches are necessarily included.

Representative Competitions
These are matches that are part of a regular representative competition.

Single matches
These are once-off matches, that aren't part of any regular league competition.

Pre season
Due to the irregular nature of the Round 1 matches of the 2011 NAB Cup, each set of three Round 1 matches are counted as one match.

Finals

Regular season

See also
Australian rules football attendance records
2011 NRL season results
Sports attendance
List of sports venues in Australia

Notes

References

External links
 Official Website of the Australian Football League
 National Rugby League
 A-League Official website
 Asian Champions League Official website

Note: Sources for this Article are from Wikipedia related articles regarding the included competitions and teams.

2011 in Australian rugby league
2011 in Australian rugby union
2011 in Australian soccer
2011 in Australian rules football
2011